The Giant Dipper is a historic wooden roller coaster located at the Santa Cruz Beach Boardwalk, an amusement park in Santa Cruz, California. The Giant Dipper, which replaced the Thompson's Scenic Railway, took 47 days to build and opened on May 17, 1924 at a cost of $50,000. As of 2012, over 60 million people have ridden the Giant Dipper since its opening. The ride has received several awards such as being named a National Historic Landmark, a Golden Age Coaster award, and a Coaster Landmark award.

History
The Thompson's Scenic Railway was built on the site of the current Giant Dipper in 1908 as the longest roller coaster in the United States. In October 1923, manager R.L. Cardiff and Walter Looff began negotiations to build a new ride to replace the Scenic Railway. The price was set at $50,000, $15,000 more than the Scenic Railway. In January 1924, the permit to build the Giant Dipper was granted to Arthur Looff. He wanted to create a ride that had "the thrill of a plunge down a mine shaft, a balloon ascent, a parachute jump, airplane acrobatics, a cyclone, a toboggan ride, and a ship in a storm." Demolition of the Scenic Railway began in January 1924 to make room for the Giant Dipper. It took 5 months to demolish the Scenic Railway and construct the Giant Dipper. The actual construction of the Giant Dipper took 47 days. The ride opened to the public for the first time on May 17, 1924.

In 1974, the ride received a new coat of paint with Victorian-style architecture around the station. In the 1989 Loma Prieta earthquake, the Giant Dipper was almost completely untouched. The ride was closed for about a month to be inspected. The park held a benefit for victims of the earthquake. In 2002, the ride celebrated its 50 millionth rider. Ten years after the 50 millionth rider, the park celebrated the Giant Dipper's 60 millionth rider on July 27, 2012. The park gave out trivia coasters leading up to the event. The 24 riders that were on the train when it hit 60 million riders received a hoodie among other prizes.

The Giant Dipper was built by Arthur Looff and designed by Frederick Church. It required  of lumber, 743,000 nails, and 24,000 bolts to construct. The lumber was provided by Homer T. Maynard Lumber, and the 70 horsepower motor, which is still used today, was provided by Santa Cruz Electric. The concrete was done by T.F. Costello, and the steel work was done by Berger and Carter.

Fatalities
The ride had a few incidents over the years in which three people have died. The first death on Giant Dipper occurred four months after it debuted, on September 21. A 15-year-old boy fell from the ride while standing up near the end of the ride. The emergency brake was applied, but the boy fell head first onto the track and was crushed by the roller coaster train. Other fatalities also occurred in 1940 and 1970. Several modifications have been made to the trains as a result.

Ride experience
After departing from the station, the train immediately enters a tunnel. After going through some drops and turns in the tunnel, the train emerges at the base of the lift hill. The train then rises up into a banked turn to the left. Riders then go through two hills next to the lift hill followed by a turnaround that is positioned over the tunnel at the beginning of the ride. The train then travels over three small hills situated next to the lift hill followed by another turnaround. Riders then go through three more small hills and enter the final brake run.

Characteristics

Trains
The Giant Dipper currently operates with two trains with six cars per train. Riders are arranged two across in two rows for a total of 24 riders per train. The trains were built by Dana Morgan from D.H. Morgan Manufacturing.

When the Giant Dipper first opened in 1924, it ran with three trains, each with ten cars. Over the years, the trains have been redesigned and replaced several times, with the current trains being the ride's third set.

Track

The track is colored red with white supports. When built in 1924,  of lumber was used. The track is inspected every two hours.

Legacy
In the early 1970s, the Giant Dipper became the last "classic roller coaster" between Vancouver, British Columbia and San Diego, California. It is only one of three Church rides to still operate. The other two are Dragon Coaster at Playland Park and Giant Dipper at Belmont Park. It is one of the only roller coasters that are still operating from what ACE calls the "golden age of roller coasters." Other than being the oldest roller coaster in California, the ride is also one of the oldest roller coasters in the world.

Reception

Since the Giant Dipper was one of the first roller coasters in existence when it opened, many people were concerned about the safety of the ride. Looff, as well as a local newspaper, insisted it was "virtually impossible" for the cars to leave the track because of the makeup of the trains and track. Although several incidents happened on the ride, none were related to the integrity of the track or trains. Many people call the Giant Dipper the icon and crown jewel of Santa Cruz Beach Boardwalk as well as one of the nation's most exciting roller coasters. It is considered to be the signature ride of the park.

The Giant Dipper is referred to in the song "Big Dipper", from the 1996 album The Golden Age by David Lowery's band Cracker. The ride also appeared in many television commercials and movies, including The Lost Boys, Sudden Impact, The Sting II, Bumblebee and Dangerous Minds.

Awards
On February 27, 1987, the United States National Park Service recognized the Giant Dipper as a National Historic Landmark along with the Looff Carousel.

It was awarded the American Coaster Enthusiasts Golden Age Coaster award in June 1994. The 1920s is often considered the "golden age of roller coaster construction" so the award recognizes the roller coasters that still remain today. It is only one of two roller coasters to receive this designation, the other being the Giant Dipper at Belmont Park. Giant Dipper was also awarded the ACE Coaster Landmark award on May 5, 2007 at the 100th anniversary of Santa Cruz Beach Boardwalk. It won the award for its innovative track design, unusual curved station and for being one of the ten oldest operating coasters in the world and one of only three remaining examples of Frederick Church's work.

Rankings

References

External links

Giant Dipper at Coaster-Net

Buildings and structures in Santa Cruz County, California
California Historical Landmarks
History of Santa Cruz County, California
Santa Cruz, California
Roller coasters in California
Roller coasters introduced in 1924
Santa Cruz Beach Boardwalk